Botswana competed at the 1984 Summer Olympics in Los Angeles, United States.

Results by event

Athletics
Men's 400 metres
 Joseph Ramotshabi
 Heat — 48.11 (→ did not advance)

Men's Marathon
 Wilson Theleso — 2:29:20 (→ 55th place)
 Johnson Mbangiwa — 2:48:12 (→ 76th place)
 Bigboy Matlapeng — did not finish (→ no ranking)

See also
 Botswana at the 1982 Commonwealth Games
 Botswana at the 1986 Commonwealth Games

References
Official Olympic Reports
sports-reference

Nations at the 1984 Summer Olympics
1984
Olympics